Abbie Howard Hunt Stuart (1840–1902) was an American suffragist and founder of the Woman's Club of Olympia.

Biography
Stuart née Hunt was born on October 28, 1840, in Boston, Massachusetts. She was a college graduate and married Robert Giffin Stuart (1825–1891) a Federal Land Commissioner in Olympia Washington Territory.  

Robert and Abbie owned a commercial building which housed retail stores including a grocery story and later on a Crombie's Drug Store. The commercial retail stores were in the ground floor while on the second floor it had studios and offices for the Women's Club before they had an official building. It was located at 550 Capitol Way S. 

Stuart was a co-founder and the first president of the Woman's Club of Olympia. Stewart was also president of the Women's Suffrage Association in Olympia.

Woman's Club of Olympia 

The club was founded on March 10, 1883, by Abbie Howard Hunt Stuart, Emily Olney French, Mary Olney Brown, Clara Sylvester, Ella Stork, and Janet Moore. Abbie donated land in which they established there permeant meetings in this building. The motto for this club was the "for study and mutual improvement of its members" .

Olympia was known for its progressive ideology throughout the west. Abbie was a cofounder of the club but didn't want to use the club as a form to expression of her pro suffrage beliefs. Instead she wanted this club to unite every women to talk about literature and non-controversial topics. The first meeting was held at the new Stuart Block building until they purchased an official one. The club rose funds, to move to the current building that was finished in 1908 by the Timberland Library. 

Unfortunately, Abbie died before the building was finished. In her honor, they named the building after her due to her being a cofounder of the Woman's Club of Olympia. Also, to mention how she didn't live when the suffrage movement was enacted. 

The Woman's Club of Olympia partnered with the General Federation of Women's Clubs to focus on issues of: 

 Conservation movement for first forest preserve
 National model for juvenile courts
 Pure Food and Drug Act
 Eight Hour Work Week/ Child Labor Laws
 Equal Rights for Women
 Equal Pay for Equal work 
 Alcohol/ Drug Abuse Education for Women and Youth
 Youth Suicide Prevention

Death and legacy

She died January 5, 1902 in San Francisco, California.

The Woman's Club of Olympia named its clubhouse in her honor, which is known as the Abigail Stuart House. The Abigail Stuart house is a non-profit, nondenominational, and nonpartisan volunteer service organization.

References

1840 births
1902 deaths
American suffragists
Activists from Massachusetts
People from Boston
Organization founders
Clubwomen
People of the Washington Territory